A stevedore, also called a longshoreman, a docker or a dockworker, is a waterfront manual laborer who is involved in loading and unloading ships, trucks, trains or airplanes.

After the shipping container revolution of the 1960s, the number of dockworkers required declined by over 90%.

Etymology
The word stevedore originated in Portugal or Spain, and entered the English language through its use by sailors. It started as a phonetic spelling of estivador (Portuguese) or estibador (Spanish), meaning a man who loads ships and stows cargo, which was the original meaning of stevedore (though there is a secondary meaning of "a man who stuffs" in Spanish); compare Latin stīpāre meaning to stuff, as in to fill with stuffing. In Ancient and modern Greek, the verb στοιβάζω (stevazo) means pile up. In the United Kingdom, people who load and unload ships are usually called dockers; in Australia, they are called stevedores, dockworkers or wharfies; and, in the United States and Canada, the term longshoreman, derived from man-along-the-shore, is used. Before the extensive use of container ships and shore-based handling machinery in the United States, longshoremen referred exclusively to the dockworkers, while stevedores, in a separate trade union, worked on the ships, operating ship's cranes and moving cargo. In Canada, the term stevedore has also been used, for example, in the name of the Western Stevedoring Company, Ltd., based in Vancouver, B.C., in the 1950s.

Loading and unloading ships

Loading and unloading ships requires knowledge of the operation of loading equipment, the proper techniques for lifting and stowing cargo, and correct handling of hazardous materials. In addition, workers must be physically strong and able to follow orders attentively. To unload a ship successfully, many longshoremen are needed. There is only a limited amount of time that a ship can be at a port, so their work must be completed quickly.

In earlier days before the introduction of containerization, men who loaded and unloaded ships had to tie down cargoes with rope. A type of stopper knot is called the stevedore knot. The method of securely tying up parcels of goods is called stevedore lashing or stevedore knotting. While loading a general cargo vessel, they use dunnage, which are pieces of wood (or nowadays sometimes strong inflatable dunnage bags) set down to keep the cargo out of any water that might be lying in the hold or are placed as shims between cargo crates for load securing.

Today, the vast majority of non-bulk cargo is transported in intermodal containers. The containers arrive at a port by truck, rail, or another ship and are stacked in the port's storage area. When the ship that will be transporting them arrives, the containers that it is offloading are unloaded by a crane. The containers either leave the port by truck or rail or are put in the storage area until they are put on another ship. Once the ship is offloaded, the containers it is leaving with are brought to the dock by truck. A crane lifts the containers from the trucks onto the ship. As the containers pile up on the ship, the workers connect them to the ship and to the other already-placed containers. The jobs involved include the crane operators, the workers who connect the containers to the ship and each other, the truck drivers that transport the containers from the dock and storage area, the workers who track the containers in the storage area as they are loaded and unloaded, as well as various supervisors. Those workers at the port who handle and move the containers are likely to be considered stevedores or longshoremen.

Before containerization, freight was often handled with a longshoreman’s hook, a tool which became emblematic of the profession (mostly on the west coast of the United States and Canada).

Traditionally, stevedores had no fixed job, but would arrive at the docks in the morning seeking employment for the day. London dockers called this practice standing on the stones, while in the United States it was referred to as shaping up or assembling for the shape-up, or "catching the breaks". In Britain, due to changes in employment laws, such jobs have either become permanent or have been converted to temporary jobs.

Dock workers have been a prominent part of the modern labor movement.

By country

Australia
In Australia, the informal term "wharfie" (from wharf labourer) and the formal "waterside worker" include the variety of occupations covered in other countries by words like stevedore. The term "stevedore" is also sometimes used, as in the company name Patrick Stevedores. The term "docker" is also used, as in the Federated Ship Painters and Dockers Union; and is the mascot of the Fremantle Dockers in the Australian Football League.

The Maritime Union of Australia has coverage of these workers and fought a substantial industrial battle in the 1998 Australian waterfront dispute to prevent the contracting out of work to non-union workers.

In 1943, stevedores in Melbourne and Sydney were deliberately exposed to mustard gas while unloading the ship Idomeneus. The result was death and permanent disability—all as a result of military secrecy.

New Zealand
New Zealand usage is very similar to the Australian version; "waterside workers" are also known as "wharfies." The 1951 New Zealand waterfront dispute, involving New Zealand stevedores, was the largest and most bitter industrial dispute in the country's history.

United Kingdom
In the United Kingdom, the definition of a stevedore varies from port to port. In some ports, only the highly skilled master of a loading gang is referred to as a "stevedore". "Docker" is the usual general term used in the UK for a worker who loads or unloads ships and performs various other jobs required at a seaport.

In some ports, a stevedore is a person who decides where cargo is stowed on a ship, for safe stowage and even balance of a ship. It is not a hands-on role.

It was once known to refer those working on a ship—loading or unloading the cargo—as stevedores, while those working on the quayside were called dockers.

In the ports along the Thames, stevedores load, whilst dockers unload (according to Michael Budge, ex docker, Tilbury and Dave Penn, ex docker, Tilbury, 1978–2018).

United States

In present-day American waterfront usage, a stevedore is usually a person or a company who manages the operation of loading or unloading a ship. In the early 19th century, the word was usually applied to black laborers or slaves who loaded and unloaded bales of cotton and other freight on and off riverboats. In Two Years Before the Mast (1840), the author Richard Henry Dana Jr. describes the steeving of a merchant sailing ship in 1834. This was the process of taking a mostly-full hold and cramming in more material. In this case, the hold was filled with hides from the California hide trade up to four feet below the deckhead (equivalent of 'ceiling'). "Books" composed of 25–50 cattle skins folded into a bundle were prepared, and a small opening created in the middle of one of the existing stacks. Then the book was shoved in by use of a pair of thick strong pieces of wood called steeves. The steeves had one end shaped as a wedge which was placed into the middle of a book to shove it into the stack. The other ends were pushed on through block and tackle attached to the hull and overhead beams and hauled on by sailors.

Typically one ethnic group dominated the stevedore market in a port, usually the Irish Catholics, as seen in the 1954 film about New York On the Waterfront.  In New Orleans there was competition between the Irish and the blacks.

In the Port of Baltimore, Polish Americans dominated.  In the 1930s, about 80% of Baltimore's longshoremen were Polish or of Polish descent. The port of Baltimore had an international reputation of fast cargo handling credited to the well-organized gang system that was nearly free of corruption, wildcat strikes, and repeated work stoppages of its other East coast counterparts. The New York Anti-Crime Commission and the Waterfront Commission looked upon the Baltimore system as the ideal one for all ports. The hiring of longshoremen in Baltimore by the gang system dates back to 1913 when the ILA was first formed. The Polish longshoremen began setting up the system by selecting the most skilled men to lead them. This newly formed gang would usually work for the same company, which would give priority to the gang. During the times where there was no work within the particular company, the gang would work elsewhere, or even divide to aid other groups in their work, which would speed up the work and make it more efficient. In an environment as dangerous as a busy waterfront, Baltimore's gangs always operated together as a unit, because the experience let them know what each member would be doing at any given time, making a waterfront a much safer place. At the beginning of the Second World War, Polish predominance in the Port of Baltimore significantly diminished, as many Poles were drafted.

It is common to use the terms "stevedore" and "longshoreman" interchangeably. The U.S. Congress has done so in the Ship Mortgage Act, 46 app. U.S.C. section 31301(5)(C) which designates both "crew wages" and "stevedore wages" as preferred maritime liens. The statute intended to give the wages of the seamen and longshoremen the same level of protection. Sometimes the word "stevedore" is used to mean "the man who loads and unloads a ship" as the British "docker".

Today, a stevedore typically owns the equipment used in the loading or discharge operation and hires longshoremen who load and unload cargo under the direction of a stevedore superintendent. This type of work along the East Coast waterfront was characteristic of ports like New York, Boston, and Philadelphia.

Today, a commercial stevedoring company also may contract with a terminal owner to manage all terminal operations. Many large container ship operators have established in-house stevedoring operations to handle cargo at their own terminals and to provide stevedoring services to other container carriers.

One union within the AFL–CIO represent longshoremen: the International Longshoremen's Association, which represents longshoremen on the East Coast, on the Great Lakes and connected waterways and along the Gulf of Mexico. The International Longshore and Warehouse Union, which represents longshoremen along the West Coast, Hawaii and Alaska, was formerly affiliated with the AFL–CIO but disaffiliated in 2013.

Famous former stevedores

Former stevedores and longshoremen include:
 Crispus Attucks – American Patriot
 Frithjof Bergmann – philosopher
 Jaguaré Bezerra de Vasconcelos – Brazilian football goalkeeper
 Mestre Bimba – founder of the Regional style of Capoeira
 Ronald Bird – English cricketer
 Jerry Colonna – Movie actor/comedian*
 Terry Bollea – Better known as professional wrestler Hulk Hogan
 Murray Bookchin – American libertarian socialist, founder of social ecology
 Harry Bridges – founder of the International Longshore and Warehouse Union (ILWU)
 James Braddock – heavyweight boxing champion from 1935 to 1937
 Joey Coyle – basis for the movie Money for Nothing
 Jack Dash – British dock workers trade union leader
 Francois Faber – road racing cyclist, Tour de France winner
 Chief Dan George – Native American actor
 Danny Greene – American mobster
 Eric Hoffer – author and philosopher
 James J. Hill – railroad industrialist and financier
 Brian Jacques – author of the Redwall book series
 Vladimir Kokkinaki –  the most famous test pilot in the Soviet Union
 Mauno Koivisto – President of Finland from 1982 to 1994
 Artie Lange – comedian/radio personality, The Howard Stern Show
 Tom Mann – British trade unionist and organizer of the London Dock Strike of 1889
 Charles Manson – convicted murderer, worked as a longshoreman from 1954 to 1956.
 Peter MacKay – Canadian former government minister and conservative party leader (a stevedore for two summers while a teenager)
 Frank McCourt – Irish-American author
 Daniel Patrick Moynihan – sociologist, ambassador to the United Nations and to India, U.S. Senator from New York
 Don Muraco – former professional wrestler, most famous as "Magnificent Muraco"
 Michael "Ozzie" Myers – U.S. Representative from Pennsylvania
 Bruce Nelson – labor historian, author of Workers on the Waterfront
 Bartolomeo Pagano – Italian actor
 Charles Plymell – poet
 Benito Quinquela Martín – painter from Buenos Aires, Argentina. His works reflect the work at the docks in La Boca, a portuary district of Buenos Aires. 
 Joe Rollino – boxer and strongman
 Glenn Theodore Seaborg – 1951 Nobel Prize winner, member of The Manhattan Project
 Hubert Selby Jr. – Writer, Last Exit To Brooklyn
 Mark E. Smith – singer/songwriter of the British band The Fall
 Stan Weir – blue-collar intellectual and sociologist, founder of Singlejack Press
 Isaac Woodard – African-American victim of a notorious racist attack
 J. S. Woodsworth – a founder of the Cooperative Commonwealth Federation, the forerunner of the New Democratic Party of Canada
 Howard Zinn – historian, playwright, and activist

In popular culture
 Poet Ella Wheeler Wilcox recited her poem "The Stevedores" (which includes the lyric: "Here's to the Army stevedores, lusty and virile and strong ... ") while visiting a camp of 9,000 stevedores in France during World War I.
In 1949, reporter Malcolm Johnson was awarded a Pulitzer Prize for a 24-part investigative series titled Crime on the Waterfront, published in the New York Sun. 
The material from Malcolm Johnson's investigative series was fictionalized and used as a basis for the influential film On the Waterfront (1954), starring Marlon Brando as a longshoreman, and the working conditions on the docks figure significantly in the film's plot.  On the Waterfront was a critical and commercial success that received twelve Academy Award nominations, and won eight including Best Picture, Best Actor for Brando, Best Supporting Actress for Eva Marie Saint, and Best Director for Elia Kazan. The American Film Institute ranked it the 8th-greatest American movie of all time in 1997 and 19th in 2007.
Playwright Arthur Miller was involved in the early stages of the development of On the Waterfront; his play A View from the Bridge (1955) also deals with the troubled life of a longshoreman.
In season 2 of the HBO series The Wire, which first aired in 2003, the Stevedore Union and its members working in Baltimore, particularly Frank Sobotka, figure prominently in the second season's story.
 The American film Kill the Irishman (2011) features Ray Stevenson as Danny Greene, head of the Longshoreman's Union.
 The tenth book of the webcomic Schlock Mercenary, titled The Longshoreman of the Apocalypse, features a robotic stevedore as a central character.

See also

1913 Sligo Dock strike
Admiralty law
Battle of Ballantyne Pier (Canada)
Dockers' Union (UK) (disambiguation)
Dunnage
Federated Ship Painters and Dockers Union
History of Squamish and Tsleil-Waututh longshoremen, 1863–1963
International Longshore and Warehouse Union (United States)
Liverpool dockers' strike (1995–98) (UK)
Mersey Docks and Harbour Company
Mudlark 
National Union of Dock Labourers
Scottish Union of Dock Labourers
Teamster
Weeks Marine

References

Further reading
 
 
 Callebert, Ralph (2017). On Durban's Docks: Zulu Workers, Rural Households, Global Labor. University of Rochester Press.

External links

 "The Irish on the Docks of Portland" by Michael Connolly

Marine occupations
Spanish words and phrases
Polish-American culture in Baltimore
Portuguese words and phrases